The Hort Baronetcy, of Castle Strange in the County of Middlesex, is a title in the Baronetage of Great Britain. It was created on 8 September 1767 for John Hort, Consul-General at Lisbon, Portugal. He was the second son of The Right Reverend Josiah Hort, Archbishop of Tuam. The second Baronet sat as Member of Parliament for Kildare from 1831 to 1832. The third Baronet was a Lieutenant-General in the British Army and fought in the Crimean War. The current Baronet is Sir Andrew Edwin Fenton Hort, of East Prawle, Devon.

The theologian Fenton John Anthony Hort was the grandson of the first Baronet.

Hort baronets, of Castle Strange (1767) 

 Sir John Hort, 1st Baronet (1735–1807)
 Sir Josiah William Hort, 2nd Baronet (1791–1876)
 Sir John Josiah Hort, 3rd Baronet (1824–1882)
 Sir William Fitzmaurice Hort, 4th Baronet (1827–1887)
 Sir Fenton Josiah Hort, 5th Baronet (1836–1902)
 Sir Arthur Fenton Hort, 6th Baronet (1864–1935), Author, schoolmaster and gardener 
 Sir Fenton George Hort, 7th Baronet (1896–1960)
 Sir James Fenton Hort, 8th Baronet (1926–1995)
 Sir Andrew Edwin Fenton Hort, 9th Baronet (born 1954)

The heir apparent is the present holder's son James John Fenton Hort (born 1989)

Sir Arthur Fenton Hort, 6th Baronet (1864–1935) 

The 6th baronet, Arthur Fenton Hort (15 Jan 1864 - 7 Mar 1935), was known as an author, schoolmaster at Harrow (1888–1922) and gardener. The son of Fenton Josiah Hort and Fanny Henrietta Holland, he was born in Cheltenham, Gloucestershire in 1864 and married Helen Frances Bell in 1894 and they had three children including the 7th baronet. He attended Trinity College (1882–1889). He translated a number of classical texts of Theophrastus, Euripedes and Livy. He died at Hurstbourne Tarrant, Hampshire in 1935.

Notes

References
 Kidd, Charles, Williamson, David (editors). Debrett's Peerage and Baronetage (1990 edition). New York: St Martin's Press, 1990, 
 

Hort
1767 establishments in Great Britain